The golden triangle rule is a rule of thumb in visual composition for photographs or paintings, especially those which have elements that follow diagonal lines. The frame is divided into four triangles of two different sizes, done by drawing one diagonal from one corner to another, and then two lines from the other corners, touching the first at 90 degree angles. There are a couple ways this can be used: 

1. Filling one of the triangles with the subject

2. Placing the diagonal elements so that they run along two of the lines

Use in software

Photoshop has an option putting guidelines for the golden triangle in the crop tool (in this case, it is simply called "triangle"). These guidelines can be flipped horizontally, by hitting shift-O or selecting "Cycle Overlay Orientation" from the overlay pull down menu.

See also
 Diagonal method - Another method for using diagonal lines in composition.

References

Photographic techniques